Julia Ward (December 1900 – June, 18 1962) was the founder of the central reference division of National Security Agency (NSA). She was inducted into the Cryptologic Hall of Honor in 2002.

Education 
Ward received her A.B. from Bryn Mawr College in 1923 and her PhD from Bryn Mawr College in 1940.

World War II 
Ward joined the cryptologic service during WWII and worked for the Signal Security Agency (the Army's cryptologic organization). She also worked as a librarian and eventually built a collection of classified and unclassified materials for use by analysts. In 1945, she became the deputy chief of the reference section. Within a few years, she turned the section into one that was known as poorly organized, into a section that was widely recognized and highly respected. 

In 1949, Ward was named head of the Collateral Branch, thereby becoming the only female branch head in the Office of Operations. In 1955, Ward was promoted to deputy chief of NSA's Liaison and Foreign Operations Section.

Cryptologic Hall of Honor 
Ward was inducted into the NSA's Cryptologic Hall of Honor in June 2002 at the National Cryptologic Museum in Baltimore, MD. Bryn Mawr College has a plaque to commemorate her placement in the Hall of Honor.

References 

American spies
Cryptologic education
American cryptographers
1900 births
1962 deaths
National Security Agency cryptographers
Bryn Mawr College alumni